Albert Bourla (born ) is a Greek-American  veterinarian and the chairman and chief executive officer of Pfizer, an American pharmaceutical company. He joined the company in 1993 and has held several executive roles across Pfizer's divisions. Prior to becoming chief executive officer, Bourla served as chief operating officer.

In addition to the boards of Pfizer and the Pfizer Foundation, he serves or has served on the boards of the Biotechnology Innovation Organization, Catalyst, the Partnership for New York City, and the Pharmaceutical Research and Manufacturers of America. Bourla is also a member of The Business Council and the Business Roundtable. 

Bourla was motivated by an early love for animals and
medicine and is credited with reshaping Pfizer to be a company focused on research and development. He is also credited with helping the development of Improvac, which eradicates boar taint, and for refocusing Pfizer's vaccine division to focus on Staphylococcus, Clostridioides difficile infection, infant diseases, and the Pfizer–BioNTech COVID-19 vaccine. He opposes government interference in pharmaceutical pricing, which he argues would hamper spending on development of new drugs. 

Bourla was awarded the 2022 Genesis Prize for his leadership in the development of the Pfizer–BioNTech COVID-19 vaccine.

Early life and education

Bourla was born and raised in Thessaloniki, Greece. His parents, who were Sephardi Jews, were among the 2,000 of 50,000 Jews in Thessaloniki to survive the Holocaust; According to Bourla, his mother was allegedly minutes away from execution by firing squad when she was spared via a ransom paid to a Nazi Party official by her non-Jewish brother-in-law, while his father happened to be out of the Jewish ghetto when the residents were taken to the Auschwitz concentration camp and went into hiding, never to see his parents again.

Bourla earned a doctorate in the biotechnology of reproduction at Aristotle University of Thessaloniki's Veterinary School in 1985. 
Bourla's doctoral thesis (1991) is titled "Effect of melatonin implants on sperm characteristics and on the freezability of Karagouniki ram semen". 12 rams were devided into two groups, 6 rams received melatonin implants.

He left Greece with his wife when he was 34 after a promotion within Pfizer and since then he has lived in seven different cities, in four different countries.

Career
Bourla joined Pfizer in 1993, first serving as a doctor of veterinary medicine and technical director for the company's animal health division in Greece.

In 2001, he immigrated to the United States.

He held multiple executive roles at Zoetis (then known as Animal Health) and other divisions of Pfizer. From 2005 to 2009, he served as area president for Animal Health's Europe, Africa and Middle East division. In 2009 he promoted the launch of Improvac on the European Market. Improvac is an immunocastration product for male pigs with the goal to reduce boar taint.  In 2009 and 2010, he oversaw the Europe, Africa, and Asia Pacific division. In the latter role, he managed the merger of Wyeth's Fort Dodge Animal Health business with Pfizer in these regions.

From 2010 to 2013, Bourla served as president and general manager of Pfizer's Established Products Business Unit. There, he built business for the company's drugs that had recently lost patent exclusivity.

From January 2014 to January 2016, Bourla served as Group President of Pfizer's Global Vaccines, Oncology, and Consumer Healthcare business, where he led Pfizer's work on cancer and heart drugs, among others, and helped launch Eliquis, an anticoagulant, and Ibrance, a breast cancer treatment drug.

From February 2016 to December 2017, he was group president of Pfizer Innovative Health. In 2016, during his tenure, Innovative Health's revenue increased by 11%.

Bourla became Pfizer's chief operating officer (COO) on January 1, 2018, overseeing the company's drug development, manufacturing, sales, and strategy. He restructured Pfizer and spun-off the consumer health care business during his tenure as COO.

He was promoted to chief executive officer in October 2018, effective January 1, 2019, succeeding Ian Read, his mentor.

In February 2019, Bourla was one of seven CEOs in the pharmaceutical industry who participated in a hearing on prescription drug prices in the United States with the United States Senate Committee on Finance.

In April 2019, at the Prix Galien Greece Awards ceremony, he was presented with the award for "Preeminent Greek Leader" of the global pharmaceutical industry by Geoffrey R. Pyatt, United States Ambassador to Greece.

In January 2020, Bourla assumed the additional post of executive chairman, upon the retirement of Ian Read.

In 2020, Bourla pushed Pfizer employees for the fast development of a COVID-19 vaccine in partnership with German company BioNTech, making sure it is safe and effective. He told his team that "financial returns should not drive any decisions" with regards to the vaccine. He took the risk of producing the Pfizer–BioNTech COVID-19 vaccine before approval from the Food and Drug Administration so that it would be ready to ship immediately upon approval. However his strategy of pricing during the pandemic has been called "war profiteering" by former CDC chief Tom Frieden.

In 2020, he was ranked as America's top CEO in the pharmaceutical industry by Institutional Investor.

In an interview he gave to the BBC in December 2021, Bourla said “there is no doubt in my mind that the benefits, completely, are in favour of” vaccinating five to 11 year old children against Covid-19. “Covid in schools is thriving... This is disturbing, significantly, the educational system, and there are kids that will have severe symptoms [without our vaccine]". Following this interview, the British Medical Ethics Authority determined that Pfizer violated the ethical code by misleading the public, making unsubstantiated claims, and by failing to present information in a factual and balanced way.

Board service and memberships
Bourla has served on the Health Section Governing board of the Biotechnology Innovation Organization, the largest biotechnology trade association worldwide. He joined Pfizer's board of directors in February 2018, and also serves on the board of the Pfizer Foundation. Bourla is a board member of Catalyst, a global nonprofit organization promoting the advancement of women, the Partnership for New York City, and the Pharmaceutical Research and Manufacturers of America (PhRMA), a trade association representing companies in the pharmaceutical industry in the United States.

Bourla is a member of The Business Council, an organization of business leaders headquartered in Washington, D.C., and the Business Roundtable, a group of chief executives of major U.S. corporations established to promote pro-business public policy.

Personal life
Bourla and his wife live in Scarsdale, New York. He has two children: a daughter and a son. He received $21 million in compensation from Pfizer in 2020.

Bourla is committed to his Greek heritage. He maintains a home in Chalkidiki, which he visits every summer. He is a supporter of the Aris Thessaloniki sports club. To benefit Greece, he organized vaccine donations, medical aid for refugees, and more than $1 million in medicine to help uninsured patients. He established the Pfizer Artificial Intelligence Center in his hometown, directed Pfizer's participation in the Thessaloniki International Fair, is close friends with Geoffrey R. Pyatt, United States Ambassador to Greece, and he brought Pfizer's leadership team to Greece to meet with Prime Minister of Greece Kyriakos Mitsotakis. 

After he was awarded the Genesis Prize by Israeli President Isaac Herzog for his leadership in delivering the Pfizer–BioNTech COVID-19 vaccine, he directed the $1 million prize to Holocaust education and the Holocaust Museum of Greece to be built in Thessaloniki. Bourla also earned a 2022 Double Helix Medal 'for spearheading the rapid development of Pfizer’s COVID-19 vaccine'.

He has made political contributions to both Republicans and Democrats, in particular to those who oppose controls on prescription drug prices in the United States.

He is regularly featured by CNBC and The New York Times and makes weekly posts on LinkedIn promoting Pfizer's work.

References

External links

 
 
 "Pfizer CEO Dr. Albert Bourla on His Family Story and Jewish Roots" YouTube video at Museum of Jewish Heritage channel 

1961 births
Living people
20th-century American Jews
Greek chief executives
Chief operating officers
Chief executives in the pharmaceutical industry
Greek businesspeople
Greek emigrants to the United States
Pfizer people
Aristotle University of Thessaloniki alumni
Greek Sephardi Jews
Jews from Thessaloniki
21st-century American Jews
American people of Greek-Jewish descent